Tiringoulou,also spelled Tirigoulou, is a village in the Vakaga Prefecture in the northern Central African Republic.

History

Central African Republic Bush War (2004-2007) 
On 25 and 26 April 2006, a mysterious Antonov cargo plane landed on Tiringoulou airstrip to unload weapons and 50 armed men who fled to the surrounding area. The locals alerted the government through radio. In response, Bozize sent Presidential Guard to the village. The Presidential Guard burned houses and attacked locals who wore camouflage uniforms or had a job related to arms-carrying.

LRA attacked the UFDR base and burned several houses in Tiringoulou on 4 October 2010, which caused four LRA fighters and one UFDR member to die. In this attack, LRA kidnapped a girl and forced her to marry an LRA member.

Central African Republic Civil War (2013-present) 
On March 2022, the Wagner Group attacked Tiringoulou and killed 12 people, including FPRC general Baba Amibe. On 25 May they again arrived in the village. In December a government delegation met there with PRNC rebels to negotatie release of kidnaped workers.

Demographics 
Goula makes up the majority of the village population.

Notable people 
Joseph Zoundeiko, Former Head of FPRC

References 

Populated places in Vakaga